Bulstrode is a surname, and may refer to:

Beatrix Bulstrode (1896-1951), English journalist and travel writer
Cecily Bulstrode (1584–1609), English courtier
 Dorothy Bulstrode (1592-1650), English courtier
 Edward Bulstrode (1588–1659), judge and writer
 Henry Bulstrode (1578–1643), English politician
 Richard Bulstrode (1610–1711), English author, diplomat and soldier, son of Edward Bulstrode (1588–1659)
 Whitelocke Bulstrode (1650–1724), English official, religious controversialist and mystical writer